Mykhailo Tyshko (born 15 January 1959) is a Soviet fencer. He won a bronze medal in the team épée event at the 1988 Summer Olympics.

References

External links
 

1959 births
Living people
Ukrainian male épée fencers
Soviet male épée fencers
Olympic fencers of the Soviet Union
Fencers at the 1988 Summer Olympics
Olympic bronze medalists for the Soviet Union
Olympic medalists in fencing
Sportspeople from Kharkiv
Medalists at the 1988 Summer Olympics
National University of Kharkiv alumni